Liquid paraffin may refer to:

 Liquid paraffin (drug)
 Mineral oil
 In chemistry, a mixture of heavier alkanes